Clio is a city in Barbour County, Alabama, United States. The population was 1,399 at the 2010 census, down from 2,206 in 2000, at which time it was a town. It is the birthplace of former Alabama governor George C. Wallace, as well as Baseball Hall of Famer and former Atlanta Braves broadcaster Don Sutton.

Geography
Clio is located in southwestern Barbour County at  (31.709922, -85.606708).

Demographics

2020 census

As of the 2020 United States census, there were 1,220 people, 442 households, and 238 families residing in the city.

2010 census
As of the census of 2010, there were 1,399 people, 514 households, and 321 families residing in the town. The racial makeup of the town was 36.5% Black or African American, 32.0% White,  0.4% Native American, 0.5% Asian, 0.1% Pacific Islander, 30.2% from other races, and .4% from two or more races. 36.0% of the population were Hispanic or Latino of any race.

There were 514 households, out of which 28.8% had children under the age of 18 living with them, 35.4% were married couples living together, 19.8% had a female householder with no husband present, and 37.5% were non-families. 30.9% of all households were made up of individuals, and 12.7% had someone living alone who was 65 years of age or older. The average household size was 2.72 and the average family size was 3.37.

In the town the population was spread out, with 26.2% under the age of 18, 12.9% from 18 to 24, 26.6% from 25 to 44, 22.4% from 45 to 64, and 11.8% who were 65 years of age or older. The median age was 31.8 years. For every 100 females, there were 95.7 males. For every 100 females age 18 and over, there were 85.4 males.

The median income for a household in the town was $21,806, and the median income for a family was $33,438. Males had a median income of $32,908 versus $25,625 for females. The per capita income for the town was $8,722. About 28.3% of families and 28.0% of the population were below the poverty line, including 33.1% of those under age 18 and 19.1% of those age 65 or over.

Notable people
McDowell Lee, member of the Alabama House of Representatives and Mayor of Clio.
George Corley Wallace, four-term Governor of Alabama and four-time candidate for U.S. President.
Don Sutton, Major League Baseball Hall of Famer.
Elton Bryson Stephens, Sr., founder of EBSCO Industries.

Points of interest
Blue Springs State Park
Easterling Correctional Facility

Gallery

References

Cities in Alabama
Cities in Barbour County, Alabama